Obla Gorica is a small dispersed settlement in the Sava Hills southeast of Šmartno pri Litiji in central Slovenia. The area is part of the traditional region of Lower Carniola, and the Municipality of Šmartno pri Litiji is now included in the Central Slovenia Statistical Region.

References

External links
Obla Gorica at Geopedia

Populated places in the Municipality of Šmartno pri Litiji